The montane grass mouse (Akodon montensis) is a rodent species from South America. It is found in Argentina, Brazil, Paraguay and Uruguay.

See also
Trichuris navonae, a parasite of A. montensis

References

Akodon
Mammals described in 1913
Taxa named by Oldfield Thomas